Tropidia scita is a common Palearctic species of hoverfly associated with wetlands, ponds and ditches. The larvae have been recorded living in the basal sheaths of Typha.

Description
External images For terms see Morphology of Diptera
Wing length . Vein R4+5 is only slightly dipped into the underlying cell. Thorax dorsum shining black with some dusted parts. Tergites 2 and 3 yellow or orange with a black median stripe. Antennae dark, brown or black. Hind femora swollen and curved. See references for determination.

Distribution
Palearctic Fennoscandia South to central France. Ireland East through Central Europe and then through Russia and the Caucasus. On to Siberia and the Russian Far East. Japan. Formosa.

References

Eristalinae
Diptera of Europe
Diptera of Asia
Insects described in 1780
Taxa named by Moses Harris